Woodside is a civil parish in the Borough of Allerdale in Cumbria, England.  It contains 16 listed buildings that are recorded in the National Heritage List for England.  All the listed buildings are designated at Grade II, the lowest of the three grades, which is applied to "buildings of national importance and special interest".  The parish lies to the north and east of the town of Wigton, it contains the hamlet of Oulton, and is otherwise rural.  All the listed buildings are houses and associated structures, farmhouses, and farm buildings.


Buildings

References

Citations

Sources

Lists of listed buildings in Cumbria